Claes Cronqvist (born 15 October 1944) is a Swedish former footballer who played as a striker.

Club career 
Claes Cronqvist began his career in Landskrona BoIS in 1962, and played 1966–1970 for Djurgårdens IF and became Swedish champion during his first year in his new club. In 1971, he transferred back to Landskrona BoIS, where he won the Swedish cup in 1972 and two bronze medals for the seasons 1975 and 1976. He set the record for most red cards in Allsvenskan (7), later matched by Mats Rubarth, in a time when the red card was less common.

International career 
He was capped 16 times for the Swedish national football team and was a member of the squad in the 1970 FIFA World Cup and in the 1974 FIFA World Cup.

Managerial career 
In 1981, he became manager for IFK Hässleholm. During 1983 and 1985 he became manager for his old club, Landskrona BoIS. In 1983 the team almost got to qualify for Allsvenskan. But the following year everything went wrong and Landskrona BoIS became instead relegated to tier 3 of Swedish football (as one of 144 teams in 12 regional leagues, instead of 28 teams in two leagues). However the club let him carry on, and after a very weak start he managed to make a turn during the second part of the 22-game league. Landskrona BoIS eventually won the regional tier 3 league and had to face Linköping FF in a home and away game qualification. Everything eventually came to be decided by a penalty shootout at Landskrona IP, of which BoIS came out as the winners and returned to tier 2 of Swedish football in 1986. But for Claes Cronqvist as manager at some kind of important level, 1985 was his last season.

He later worked as a trainer in the lower divisions.
Year 2015 Claes Cronqvist received a stone of honor at Landskrona Walk of Fame.

Honours 
 Djurgårdens IF 
 Allsvenskan: 1966
 Landskrona BoIS
 Svenska Cupen: 1972

References

External links

Swedish footballers
Sweden international footballers
1970 FIFA World Cup players
1974 FIFA World Cup players
Landskrona BoIS players
Djurgårdens IF Fotboll players
Swedish football managers
Landskrona BoIS managers
Allsvenskan players
1944 births
Living people
Association football forwards